"Blood Will Tell" is a Nero Wolfe mystery novella by Rex Stout, first published in the December 1963 issue of Ellery Queen's Mystery Magazine. It first appeared in book form in the short-story collection Trio for Blunt Instruments, published by the Viking Press in 1964.

Plot summary

Archie Goodwin receives a blood-stained tie in the mail from the owner of a small walk-up apartment building in lower Manhattan, who also lives on the top floor. Archie investigates, only to find yet another dead body and now has to sort out the mess, preferably collecting a fee along the way since the other adventures in this volume have not earned the costly Nero Wolfe operation a cent.

Publication history

"Blood Will Tell"
1963, Ellery Queen's Mystery Magazine, December 1963
1971, Ellery Queen's Anthology, Fall–Winter 1971

Trio for Blunt Instruments
1964, New York: The Viking Press, April 24, 1964, hardcover
Contents include "Kill Now—Pay Later", "Murder Is Corny" and "Blood Will Tell".
In his limited-edition pamphlet, Collecting Mystery Fiction #10, Rex Stout's Nero Wolfe Part II, Otto Penzler describes the first edition of Trio for Blunt Instruments: "Orange cloth, front cover and spine printed with blue rules; the front cover printed with blue lettering; the spine is printed with black lettering; rear cover blank. Issued in a mainly red pictorial dust wrapper."
In April 2006, Firsts: The Book Collector's Magazine estimated that the first edition of Trio for Blunt Instruments had a value of between $150 and $300. The estimate is for a copy in very good to fine condition in a like dustjacket.
1964, New York: Viking (Mystery Guild), June 1964, hardcover
The far less valuable Viking book club edition may be distinguished from the first edition in three ways:
 The dust jacket has "Book Club Edition" printed on the inside front flap, and the price is absent (first editions may be price clipped if they were given as gifts).
 Book club editions are sometimes thinner and always taller (usually a quarter of an inch) than first editions.
 Book club editions are bound in cardboard, and first editions are bound in cloth (or have at least a cloth spine).
1965, London: Collins Crime Club, January 1965, hardcover
1967, New York: Bantam #F-3298, January 1967
1997, New York: Bantam Crimeline  January 1, 1997, paperback
1997, Newport Beach, California: Books on Tape, Inc.  October 31, 1997, audio cassette (unabridged, read by Michael Prichard)
2010, New York: Bantam Crimeline  July 21, 2010, e-book

References

External links

1963 short stories
Nero Wolfe short stories
Works originally published in Ellery Queen's Mystery Magazine